This is a list of bands from the Netherlands.

0-9 

 2 Brothers on the 4th Floor
 2 Unlimited
 3JS

A 

 a balladeer
 Accordéon Mélancolique
 Acda en De Munnik
 Alamo Race Track
 Alquin
 The Amazing Stroopwafels
 Ambeon
 Antidote
 Antillectual
 The Apers
 Arling & Cameron
 Asphyx
 Asrai
 Audiotransparent
 Aux Raus
 Ayreon

B 

 Babe
 George Baker Selection
 Bardo State
 Barthezz
 Batmobile
 Bauer
 Beatbusters
 Bearforce1
 Beef
 Benjamin B
 Bettie Serveert
 Bintangs
 Blackbriar
 Bloem de Ligny
 Bløf
 Blue Diamonds
 Frank Boeijen Groep
 The Bohemes
 Bojoura
 Bolland & Bolland
 Born From Pain
 Bots
 Brainbox
 Brainpower
 BZN
 Banji

C 

 Caesar
 The Cats
 Cesair
 Chef'Special
 Ch!pz
 Clan of Xymox
 Claw Boys Claw
 Cloudmachine
 Coparck
 Cuby + Blizzards

D 

 D-Men
 Daryll-Ann
 Day Six
 Dawnseekers
 Def P & Beatbusters
 Delain
 De Staat
 Destine
 Detonation
 Di-rect
 Diesel
 Do
 Do-The-Undo
 Doe Maar
 Dolly Dots
 Doop
 Dutch Swing College Band

E 

 Earth & Fire
 Ekseption
 El Pino and the Volunteers
 Elexorien
 Epica
 Euromasters
 The Ex
 Extince

F 

 Face Tomorrow
 Fantastique
 Fatal Flowers
 Finch
 Flairck
 Fluitsma & Van Tijn
 Focus
 Follow That Dream
 Freeway
 Frizzle Sizzle

G 

 The Gathering
 Gem
 The Gentle Storm
 Ghost Trucker
 Go Back to the Zoo
 Het Goede Doel
 God Dethroned
 Golden Earring
 Gorefest
 Gotcha!
 Green Lizard
 Group 1850
 Gruppo Sportivo
 Guilt Machine

H 

 Hallo Venray
 De Hardheid
 Hardwell
 De Havenzangers
 Hearts of Soul
 Heideroosjes
 Heidevolk
 The Herb Spectacles
 Hermes House Band
 The Hotchas
 The Hunters

I 

 I Against I
 I-F
 I Spy
 Ileum
 Incision
 Intwine
 Ivy Green

J 

 Jan Akkerman
 Jeroen van der Boom
 Jeroen van Koningsbrugge
 Johan
 John Coffey
 Jozef van Wissem
 J-Stars

K 

 K-liber
 K-otic
 Kane
 Kayak
 Kensington
 De Kift
 Kinderen voor Kinderen
 Klubbheads
 Kraak & Smaak
 Krang
 Krezip

L 

 L.A. Style
 Laidback Luke
 Laserdance
 Thé Lau
 Legion Of The Damned
 Legowelt
 The Lemming
 Loïs Lane
 LPG
 Lucky Fonz III
 Luie Hond
 Luv'

M 

 The Mad Trist
 Madhouse
 Marching and Cycling Band HHK
 Marlayne
 Maywood
 The medics
 Moke
 Mo'Jones
 Moss
 The Motions
 Mouth & MacNeal
 Mr. Review

N 

 Nembrionic
 Nemesea
 New Adventures
 New Cool Collective
 Nick & Simon
 The Nits
 Normaal
 Noisia

O 

 Odyssice
 Officium Triste
 OG3NE
 Omnia
 Opgezwolle
 Orphanage
 Osdorp Posse
 The Outsiders

P 

 Party Animals
 The Partysquad
 Pater Moeskroen
 Pestilence
 Peter Pan Speedrock
 Picture
 Plaeto
 Pussycat

Q 

 Q65

R 

 Racoon
 Rank 1
 Rapalje
 Renée
 ReVamp
 Room Eleven
 Roosbeef
 Rosemary's Sons
 Rotterdam Philharmonic Orchestra
 Rotterdam Termination Source
 Rotterdam Terror Corps
 Rowwen Hèze
 Royal Concertgebouw Orchestra

S 

 Sandra & Andres
 Saskia & Serge
 The Scene
 The Serenes
 The Sheer
 Shocking Blue
 The Shoes
 Silence is Sexy
 Silhouette
 Silkstone
 Sinister
 Sita
 Skik
 Sky Architect
 Smogus
 Solo
 Solution
 Speedy J
 De Spelbrekers
 Spinvis
 Star One
 Stars on 45
 Stream of Passion

T 

 T-Spoon
 Teach-In
 Tee-Set
 Ten Sharp
 Textures
 Thanatos
 Tielman Brothers
 Time Bandits
 Total Touch
 Trace
 The Travoltas
 Trio Lescano
 Tuindorp Hustler Click
 Twarres
 Twenty 4 Seven
 Two Brothers on the 4th Floor

U 

 Urban Dance Squad

V 

 Van Dik Hout
 VanDenBerg
 Vandenberg's Moonkings
 Vengaboys
 Vengeance
 The Visitor
 Vitesse
 VOF de Kunst
 Voicst
 Volumia!
 Vulcano

W 

 W&W
 WETT
 What Fun!
 Wild Romance
 Within Temptation

X 

 XYP

Y 

 Yukka

Z 

 Zinatra
 Zuco 103
 zZz

See also 

 List of Dutch artists
 List of Dutch composers
 List of Dutch musicians

 
Dutch music-related lists